Uralochka-ZMZ Zlatoust is a Russian women's water polo club from Zlatoust.

Uralochka won the first edition of the Russian Championship in 1992, and it subsequently won four more titles between 1999 and 2002, also reaching the final of the European Cup in 2000. Between 1996-98 and 2004-08 it was the championship's runner-up, second to SKIF Izmaylovo and Kinef Kirishi respectively.

Most recently Uralochka was 4th in the 2012 championship and reached the LEN Trophy's quarterfinals.

Titles
 Soviet Championship
 1990
 Soviet Cup
 1989, 1990
 Russian Championship
 1992, 1999, 2000, 2001, 2002
 Russian Cup
 1992, 1999, 2000, 2002, 2006

References

Water polo clubs in Russia
LEN Women's Champions' Cup clubs
Sport in Chelyabinsk Oblast